Kingston Brook is a small river in central England. It arises near Old Dalby, Leicestershire on the northern edge of the ridge running from Normanton-on-Soar, Nottinghamshire to Belvoir, Leicestershire. It runs through Willoughby on the Wolds, to the south of Wysall (where it picks up a number of minor tributaries), Costock, East Leake (where it is joined by Sheepwash Brook), West Leake and meets the River Soar near Kingston-on-Soar.

References

Rivers of Leicestershire
Rivers of Nottinghamshire
1Kingston